Alyson Santos Silva (born 20 February 1996), commonly known as Alyson, is a Brazilian footballer who currently plays as a midfielder for EC São Bernardo.

Career statistics

Club

Notes

References

1996 births
Living people
Brazilian footballers
Brazilian expatriate footballers
Association football midfielders
São Bernardo Futebol Clube players
Sociedade Esportiva Palmeiras players
Boa Esporte Clube players
Volta Redonda FC players
K.S.V. Roeselare players
Associação Desportiva Confiança players
Campeonato Brasileiro Série B players
Brazilian expatriate sportspeople in Belgium
Expatriate footballers in Belgium
Footballers from São Paulo